Veldkamps Meuln is a 19th-century tower mill in the village of Bellingwolde in the Netherlands.

Location 
Veldkamps Meuln is located at the Hoofdweg in the village of Bellingwolde in the east of the province of Groningen in the northeast of the Netherlands.

History 
Veldkamps Meuln was built as a grist and oil mill by the Veldkamp family in 1855. The mill was heavily damaged by a storm in 1895. It has been a national heritage site since 1972. The mill was again heavily damaged by storms in 1972 and 1976. The windmill was restored in 2002–2003.

Description

Veldkamps Meuln is a seven storey tower mill with a stage at third floor level. The cap is covered with dakleer. The sails are winded by a tailpole and winch. The windshaft carries a brake wheel which has 59 teeth. This drives a wallower with 30 teeth. The wallower is at the top of the upright shaft, which has a great spur wheel at its bottom. This has 86 teeth. It drives two stone nuts, which drive the millstones. The stone nuts have 24 and 26 staves respectively. The millstones are driven overdrift.

References

External links 

 

1855 establishments in the Netherlands
Bellingwolde
Flour mills
Grinding mills in the Netherlands
Rijksmonuments in Groningen (province)
Tower mills in the Netherlands
Windmills completed in 1855
Windmills in Groningen (province)
19th-century architecture in the Netherlands